Alfred Kastil (May 12, 1874, Graz – July 20, 1950, Niederösterreich) was an Austrian philosopher.

He earned his doctorate in 1898 at the University of Prague with the thesis Prinzipien der Aristotelischen Ethik (Principles of Aristotelian Ethics) under the supervision of Anton Marty. Kastil habilitated in 1901 with the thesis Zur Lehre von der Willensfreiheit in der nikomachischen Ethik (On the Doctrine of Free Will in Nicomachean Ethics).

He taught as a professor at the Innsbruck University (1912–1933).

Works 
 Die Frage nach der Erkenntnis des Guten bei Aristoteles und Thomas, 1900
 F. Brentanos Kategorienlehre, 1934
 Ontologische und gnoseologischer Wahrheitsbegriff, 1934

References 
 Kastil, Alfred (1874-1950), Philosoph, ÖBL.

Austrian philosophers
1874 births
1950 deaths